Konuško is a small dispersed settlement in the Municipality of Šmarje pri Jelšah in eastern Slovenia. It lies in the hills south of Šmarje in the traditional region of Styria. With the division of Slovenia into statistical regions in 2007 the entire municipality was included in the Savinja Statistical Region.

References

External links
Konuško at Geopedia

Populated places in the Municipality of Šmarje pri Jelšah